The Places of Religious Worship Act 1812 (52 Geo. 3, c. 155) was an Act of the Parliament of the United Kingdom. It updated the 1689 Toleration Act's system of registration for places of worship used by Protestant Dissenters except Quakers and set up a system of punishments for offenders against the Act. It also repealed the Five Mile Act 1665 and the Conventicles Act 1670.

References

United Kingdom Acts of Parliament 1812
English Dissenters